The 1999 Cross River State gubernatorial election occurred in Nigeria on January 9, 1999. The PDP nominee Donald Duke won the election, defeating the APP candidate.

Donald Duke emerged PDP candidate.

Electoral system
The Governor of Cross River State is elected using the plurality voting system.

Primary election

PDP primary
The PDP primary election was won by Donald Duke.

Results
The total number of registered voters in the state was 1,091,930. Total number of votes cast was 1,006,387 while number of valid votes was 998,607. Rejected votes were 7,780.

References 

Cross River State gubernatorial elections
Cross River State gubernatorial election
Cross River State gubernatorial election
Cross River State gubernatorial election